The Shri Ganganagar–Sadulpur line or Sri Ganganagar–Hanumangarh–Sadulpur line is a railway route on the North Western Railway zone of Indian Railways. This route plays an important role in rail transportation of Bikaner division of Rajasthan state and some portion of Sirsa district of Haryana.

History

 The first phase, from Sri Ganganagar Junction to Sadulshahr was opened on 1 August 1923.
 The second phase, from Sadulshahr to Hanumanagarh Junction was opened on 27 April 1923.
 The third phase, from Hanumangarh Junction to Nohar was opened on 15 September 1927.
 The fourth phase, from Nohar to Tahsil Bhadra was opened on 16 September 1928.
 The Fifth phase, from Tahsil Bhadra to Suratpura Junction was opened on 13 November 1930.

After that, the conversion of main line into  broad gauge was sanctioned in 2006-07, Which is another important line for military purpose because this railway line also connects to the Jodhpur–Bathinda railway line which it lies nearest of International border of India, was opened in different sections.

 The first phase, between Shri Ganganagar and Hanumangarh Junction was opened on 29 January 2014.
 The second phase, between Hanumangarh Juncrion and Suratpura Junction was opened on 24 May 2016.

Electrification
Currently the electrification is going on dividing the three sections of this route, the first section is Sadulpur Junction–Nohar, the second section is Nohar–Hanumangarh Junction and the third section is Hanumangarh Junction–Shri Ganganagar Junction. The first section is electrified on 31 March 2021. and the second and third section is currently going under progress.

Trains passing through this line
 Sri Ganganagar–Tiruchirappalli Humsafar Express
 Kota–Shri Ganganagar Superfast Express
 Hazur Sahib Nanded–Shri Ganganagar Superfast Express via Hanumangarh
 Firozpur Cantonment–Shri Ganganagar Express
 Amrapur Aravali Express

References

5 ft 6 in gauge railways in India
Bikaner railway division
Rail transport in Rajasthan
Rail transport in Haryana